Edward Chun is a singer-songwriter and music producer who is best known for writing and performing "Give My Love," the title song to the SBS mini-series, Save the Last Dance for Me.  Other works include the musical The After Midnight Club (The Club) and the SBS mini-series Let's Go to the Beach.

Chun is currently hosting a music program on Arirang Radio called Wake Up To Arirang.

Discography

Save the Last Dance for Me
Music Producer: Edward Chun
Partial track list:
 "Give My Love" (written and performed by Edward Chun)
 "Our Love Will Always Last" (written and performed by Edward Chun)
 "Stay With Me" (written by Danny Ahn, performed by Lyn)
 "See Your Heart" (music by Lee Gyuh Rah, lyrics by Kim Joon Sun, performed by Ji-hye)
 "My Dream" (music by Jo Gyu Mahn, lyrics by Eugene, performed by Eugene)
 "25 Million" (written and performed by Edward Chun)
 "그녀가 아니면 안돼는거죠" (music by Lee Gyuh Rah, lyrics by Myung In Hee, performed by Ji-hye)
 "Waiting For Your Love" (music by Edward Chun and Kim Joon Sun, lyrics by Kim Joon Sun, performed by Soul System)
 "추억 (Memory)" (music by Edward Chun)
 "Everything (Andrew's Song)" (written and performed by Edward Chun)
 "Destiny" (music by Edward Chun)

Let’s Go to the Beach
Music Producer: Edward Chun
Partial Track list:
 "Summer Love" (written and performed by Edward Chun)
 "Keep You In My Heart" (music by Edward Chun, lyrics by Kim Joon Sun, performed by Big Mama King)  
 "Ocean Blue" (music by Edward Chun, lyrics by Kim Joon Sun, performed by Shin Hyesung and Lee Minwoo)
 "오직 너에게만 (Your Love Is All I Need)" (music by Edward Chun, lyrics by Kim Seo Joon, performed by Seo Joon ft. Sa Kang)
 "하늘 (영원한 사랑)" music by Hwang Sang Je, lyrics by Lee Minwoo, performed by Shin Hyesung and Tsuyoshi Kusanagi (草彅 剛))
 "꿈" (music by Edward Chun, lyrics by Edward Chun, Kim Joon Sun and Eddie (SoRi), performed by SoRi)
 "Happy Together" (music and lyrics by Kim Joon Sun, performed by A*Sia)
 "1961" (written and performed by Edward Chun)
 "Rock And Roll Savior" (music by Edward Chun, lyrics by Edward Chun and Kim Seo Joon, performed by Dragon)
 "Romance" (music by Edward Chun)
 "Feel My Love (그대 사랑의 감사해요)" (music by Lee Gyuh Rah, lyrics by Song Seung Hwa, Lee Yoon Jung and Lee Gyuh Rah, performed by Shin Eun Jin)
 "Your Love Is All I Need" (written and performed by Edward Chun)

Television and Musical Work
 Save the Last Dance for Me (2004)
 Let's Go to the Beach (2005)
 The After Midnight Club (2005)
 MBC "Best Theater" (Episode: "문신 (Tattoo)") (2005)
 The Club (2007)

References

South Korean male singer-songwriters
Living people
Year of birth missing (living people)